Tinak Airport, is a public use airstrip located in the village of Tinak on Arno Atoll, Marshall Islands.

Facilities 
Tinak Airport is at an elevation of 4 feet (1.2 m) above mean sea level. The runway is designated 05/23 with a coral gravel surface measuring 2,850 by 45 feet (869 x 14 m). There are no aircraft based at Tinak.

Airlines and destinations

References

External links
AirNav airport information for N18

Airports in the Marshall Islands